Pierre Petit may refer to:
 Pierre Petit (engineer) (1594–1677), French military engineer, mathematician, and physicist
 Pierre Petit (scholar) (1617–1687), French poet, doctor, and classicist
 Pierre Petit (photographer) (1832–1909), French photographer
 Pierre Petit de Julleville (1876–1947), French Catholic archbishop
 Pierre Petit (cinematographer) (1920–1997), French cinematographer
 Pierre Petit (composer) (1922–2000), French composer
 Pierre Petit (politician) (born 1930), Martinique politician
 Pierre Petit (racing driver) (born 1957), French racecar driver